Tendridae is a family of bryozoans belonging to the order Cheilostomatida.

Genera:
 Heterooecium Hincks, 1892
 Tendra de Nordmann, 1839

References

Cheilostomatida